Buli was an ancient Indo-Aryan tribe of north-eastern South Asia whose existence is attested during the Iron Age.

Location
The territory of the Bulayas was located near Magadha, and their neighbours were the Brāhmaṇa tribe of Veṭhadīpa-Droṇagrāma.

The capital city of the Bulayas was the city of Allakappa.

Name
The exact origin of the name of the Buli tribe is unknown, although it might have been derived from the Sanskrit root , meaning to "cause to sink" or "to submerge."

The name  would thus have meant "suitably damp" or "almost damp."

History

The Bulayas became Buddhists during the life of the Buddha, and after he passed away and was cremated in the city of Kusinārā, the Bulayas sent a messenger to the Mallakas of Kusinārā to demand a share of his relics.

Political and social organisation

Republican institutions

The Assembly
Like the other , the ruling body of the Buli republic was an Assembly of the  elders who held the title of s (meaning "chiefs").

The Council
The Assembly met rarely, and the administration of the republic was instead in the hands of the Council, which was a smaller body of the Assembly, whose members were elected from the assembly. The Council met more often than the Assembly.

The Consul
The consul  administered the republic with the assistance of the Assembly and Council.

References

Sources

 

Ancient peoples of India
Ancient peoples of Nepal
Gaṇa saṅghas